Food Chain Magnate is a strategy board game published in 2015 by Dutch board game publisher Splotter Spellen. The game involves competition between players for which fast food restaurant chain can earn the most money.

In 2019, Splotter Spellen released Food Chain Magnate: The Ketchup Mechanism & Other Ideas, an expansion to the main game.

Reception 
In 2022, IGN listed the game as one of the best strategy board games, praising "a richly strategic experience in which inexperienced players can beggar themselves with staggering ease", and noting its "tasty helping of capitalist satire plain to see beneath the game mechanics". CNET ranked the game as the "best complex strategy game" for 2022 and mentioned its "sheer scope". Shut Up & Sit Down praised the game, describing it as "cutthroat" in a positive sense, but criticised the game's 'reserve' card system because they result in players not knowing how long the game is expected to run was when they begin play.

References

External links 
 
 

Board games introduced in 2015
Dutch board games
Economic simulation board games
Strategy games